Hakea auriculata is a reasonably common shrub in the family Proteaceae endemic to Western Australia. A very showy species in full bloom with creamy white, yellow, dark red or reddish purple fragrant flowers.

Description
Smaller branches are either covered in long soft hairs or smooth. Leaves may have a sparse covering of matted hairs or smooth. Flowers appear in upper leaf axils from June to October. The surface is rough with numerous curving spines ending with a small blunt beak.

Taxonomy and naming
Hakea auriculata  was first formally described by botanist Carl Meissner in 1855 as part of the William Jackson Hooker work Hooker's Journal of Botany and Kew Garden Miscellany.
The specific epithet (auriculata) is derived from the Latin word auricula  meaning "lobe of the ear" or "little ear" referring to the shape of the base of the leaf.

Distribution and habitat
Hakea auriculata  is endemic to areas along the west coast in the Wheatbelt and Mid West regions of Western Australia between Northampton and Gingin where it grows in sandy heaths and among stony hills and breakaways sometimes over laterite or granite.

References

auriculata
Eudicots of Western Australia
Plants described in 1855
Taxa named by Carl Meissner